Du Abi (also Doābī) is a village located at  with an altitude of 3091 m in the central part of Nawur District, Ghazni Province, Afghanistan. It is the Nawur district administrative center where the local council (or shura) sits.  The name is also applied to include another village just south of Du Abi, on the same stream.

See also
 Ghazni Province

Notes

Populated places in Ghazni Province